is a town located in Chiba Prefecture, Japan., the town had an estimated population of  5,884 in 2471 households and a population density of 300 persons per km².

Etymology
The name of the town of Kōzaki in the Japanese language is formed from two kanji characters. The first, means kami, the Japanese term for god, spirit, or a natural force; and the second,  means "cape" or "small peninsula".

Geography
Kōzaki is located in far northern Chiba Prefecture, approximately 40 kilometers from then prefectural capital at Chiba and 60 to 70 kilometers from central Tokyo. The town faces the Tone River to the north, and sits on the lowlands of the river to the north and the Shimōsa Plateau to the south. Kōzaki is part of Ōtone Prefectural Natural Park.

Neighboring municipalities
Chiba Prefecture
Narita
Katori
Ibaraki Prefecture
Inashiki
Kawachi

Climate
Kōzaki has a humid subtropical climate (Köppen Cfa) characterized by warm summers and cool winters with light to no snowfall.  The average annual temperature in Kōzaki is 14.5 °C. The average annual rainfall is 1414 mm with September as the wettest month. The temperatures are highest on average in August, at around 26.0 °C, and lowest in January, at around 4.0 °C.

Demographics
Per Japanese census data, the population of Kōzaki has remained relatively steady over the past 70 years.

History
Kōzaki was historically part of Shimōsa Province until the formation of Chiba Prefecture at the beginning of the Meiji Period (1868 – 1912). Kōzaki and Yonezawa villages were founded on April 1, 1889 within Katori District of Chiba Prefecture with the creation the modern municipalities system. Kōzaki was elevated to town status on March 12, 1890. On January 5, 1955,  Yonezawa merged into the town of Kōzaki.

Government
Kōzaki has a mayor-council form of government with a directly elected mayor and a unicameral town council of 13 members. Kōzaki, together with the city of Katori and town of Tako, contributes two members to the Chiba Prefectural Assembly. In terms of national politics, the town is part of Chiba 10th district of the lower house of the Diet of Japan.

Economy
Kōzaki is a regional commercial center with some light manufacturing industries. Some 28% of the workforce commutes to the city of Narita per the 2010 census.

Education
Kōzaki has two public elementary schools and one public middle school operated by the town government. The town does not have a public high school; however,  the Chiba Prefectural Board of Education operates one special education school for the handicapped.

Transportation

Railway
 JR East –  Narita Line

Highway
  – Kōzaki Interchange

References

External links

Official Website 

Towns in Chiba Prefecture
Populated places established in 1955
1955 establishments in Japan
Kōzaki